Kerstersia gyiorum  is a Gram-negative, catalase-positive, oxidase-negative, bacterium of the genus Kerstersia, isolated from various human clinical samples.

References

External links
Type strain of Kerstersia gyiorum at BacDive -  the Bacterial Diversity Metadatabase

Burkholderiales
Bacteria described in 2003